Dawson Bay is a community in the Canadian province of Manitoba.

Dawson Bay is situated near the western shore of Lake Winnipegosis on Dawson Bay. It is near Mafeking, Manitoba and serviced by PTH #10. The community is administered under the Northern Affairs Act by a mayor and
council .

Demographics 

References

 Dawson Bay - Northern Affairs Community, Government of Manitoba website

Designated places in Manitoba
Northern communities in Manitoba